Golden Heroes is a superhero role-playing game that was originally written and published on an amateur basis in 1982. Games Workshop then published a more complete version in 1984.  It was written by Simon Burley and Peter Haines and was illustrated by a group of artists who were working for 2000 AD at the time.

Description
The game was published in a box, the rules books features fake bar codes and Comics Code approval badges.

The character generation system is a combination of random rolling and design.  Players roll some random superpowers which they can the customise and develop in various ways to create a character they want to play. A character can only keep their full set of powers if they can justify them all in a plausible origins story.  

The system really strives to recreate comics, with the actions occurring in "frames" and a lot of classic comics assumptions being written into the rules. Characters are "rated" after each game and are more likely to succeed in future games if they behave in ways consistent with ComicBook tropes.

Simon Burley, one of the original authors of Golden Heroes, has since revisited the genre and issued a new game - informed by the same aesthetic - called Squadron UK.

Publication history
Golden Heroes was first published in an amateur - photocopied - format by the original authors in 1982. The more professional and complete version was published by Games Workshop in 1984.

Reception
Marcus L. Rowland reviewed Golden Heroes for White Dwarf #62, giving it an overall rating of 10 out of 10, and stated that "As a late contender in the super RPG field, Golden Heroes faces severe opposition from established games. However, its quality, scope, and the fact that it is orientated towards British players are bound to make it successful, if there is a steady flow of supplements and scenarios."

Pete Tamlyn reviewed Golden Heroes for Imagine magazine, and stated that "For younger players, and If you just want the Superhero game for light relief and one-off scenarios, then MSH is the best, but if you are planning to run an extended Superhero campaign then Golden Heroes wins hands down."

Tony Johnston did a retrospective review of Golden Heroes for Arcane magazine, stating that "A superb system, and one which some referees I know still use today, adapted for other games."

Golden Heroes was ranked 41st in the 1996 reader poll of Arcane magazine to determine the 50 most popular roleplaying games of all time.  The UK magazine's editor Paul Pettengale commented: "The gameplay reflects a refined approach to the superhero genre, and roleplaying tends to take priority over combat."

Reviews
Different Worlds #43
The V.I.P. of Gaming Magazine #3 (April/May, 1986)

References

British role-playing games
Contemporary role-playing games
Games Workshop games
Role-playing games introduced in 1982
Superhero role-playing games